The IFFCO Chowk Metro Station is located on the Yellow Line of the Delhi Metro.

The station is located near the headquarters of IFFCO, PowerGrid Corporation of India and RITES Limited. It is also in the vicinity of Essel Towers (residential complex) and Westin Hotel, Gurugram.

As per the Phase 3 expansion by DMRC, this station would be the terminal point of the Airport Express Line towards New Delhi Railway Station. This branch extension would benefit commuters of Old and New Gurgaon from travelling to the Airport T-3. IFFCO Chowk to T-3 station would take approximately 14 minutes while to New Delhi, it will take around 30–35 minutes. This branch is expected to be operational by 2016. Gurugram would be the first city outside New Delhi and in NCR to be connected directly with the airport.

History

Station layout

Facilities
List of available ATM at IFFCO Chowk metro station are HDFC Bank, State Bank of India

Entry/Exit

Connections

Bus
Bus routes OLA19, OLA105, OLA137, OLA140 serves the station from outside metro station stop.

See also
Haryana
Gurgaon
List of Delhi Metro stations
Transport in Delhi
Delhi Metro Rail Corporation
Delhi Suburban Railway
Delhi Monorail
Delhi Transport Corporation
South East Delhi
New Delhi
National Capital Region (India)
List of rapid transit systems
List of metro systems

References

External links

 Delhi Metro Rail Corporation Ltd. (Official site) 
 Delhi Metro Annual Reports
 
 UrbanRail.Net – Descriptions of all metro systems in the world, each with a schematic map showing all stations.

Delhi Metro stations
Railway stations opened in 2010
Railway stations in Gurgaon district
2010 establishments in Delhi